Yelizavetovka is a rural locality (a selo) in Beryozovskoye Rural Settlement, Vorobyovsky District, Voronezh Oblast, Russia. The population was 379 in 2010. There are five streets.

Geography 
Yelizavetovka is located 18 km north of Vorobyovka (the district's administrative centre) by road. Beryozovka is the nearest rural locality.

References 

Rural localities in Vorobyovsky District